Parliamentary elections were held in Portugal on 26 October 1969. The elections were announced on 12 August, and were the first under Prime Minister Marcello Caetano, appointed in the previous year to replace long-term Prime Minister António de Oliveira Salazar, who had been left incapacitated after a stroke. The quasi-sovereign National Union won all seats with an official turnout of 62.5%.

Electoral system
The constitution of 1933 stated that elections were to be held in all of Portugal's 18 constituencies by majority party list system, with all seats in each constituency going to the party list with a plurality of votes. In order to select a specific candidate, voters were formally able to strike out names.

The electoral law of 5 December 1958 (rearranged to allow for the National Assembly to appoint the president) guaranteed universal suffrage for all mature, literate citizens, but unofficially curtailed female participation. All natural-born nationals residing in Portugal for the previous five years were allowed to stand for election.

The Chamber of Corporations, consisting of 200 members or more, was appointed by the government following the election to the National Assembly. The electoral commissions were officially banned on 8 November, with numerous candidates having retired prematurely due to reportedly extensive harassment and voter manipulation.

Parties 
The major parties involved and the respective leaders:

 Democratic Electoral Commission (CDE), Francisco Pereira de Moura
 Monarchist Electoral Commission (CEM), Rolão Preto
 National Union (UN), Marcello Caetano
 United Democratic Electoral Commission (CEUD), Mário Soares

Results

References

See also
Politics of Portugal
List of political parties in Portugal
Elections in Portugal

Legislative election
Portugal
1969 legislative
October 1969 events in Europe